This is a list of notable people who are from Toronto, Ontario, or have spent a large part or formative part of their career in that city.

A

 Abdominal – hip hop musician
 Patrick J. Adams – actor (Suits)
 Oluniké Adeliyi – actress (Flashpoint)
 Chris Alexander   diplomat
 Robbie Amell – actor
 Stephen Amell – actor (Arrow)
 Enza Anderson – writer, transgender rights activist
 Shamier Anderson – actor
 Gordon Stewart Anderson – author
 John Andrews – architect
 Mark Andrews – swimmer
 Lou Angotti – former NHL player
 Kent Angus – businessman
 Steve Anthony – television host
 Danny Antonucci – animator and creator of Ed, Edd n Eddy
 Andreas Apostolopoulos – businessman
 Alfred Apps – businessman, lawyer and political activist
 Syl Apps – former NHL player
 Will Arnett – actor
 Amy Ashmore Clark – vaudeville performer, songwriter, composer
 Margaret Atwood – Booker Prize-winning novelist, poet, literary critic and essayist
 Ayria – musician
 Yank Azman – actor

B
 Andrew Bachelor – actor, comedian, and internet personality
 Jake Beale  – voice actor
 Jay Bahadur – journalist and author, known for his reporting on piracy in Somalia
 Frederick Banting – medical scientist and doctor, co-discoverer of insulin, 1923 Nobel laureate
 Thomas J. Bata – businessman
 Robert Bateman – painter
 RJ Barrett – NBA player
 Isabel Bayrakdarian – opera singer
 Samantha Bee – actress and comedian
 Jeanne Beker – fashion television personality and reporter
 John Wilson Bengough – cartoonist
 Alfred David Benjamin – Australian-born businessman and philanthropist
 Anthony Bennett – NBA player
 Christine Bentley – CTV news anchor
 Nikki Benz – pornographic film actress
 Pierre Berton – author, historian, journalist and TV personality
 Charles Best – medical scientist, co-discoverer of insulin
 Sim Bhullar – professional basketball player
 Alfred J. Billes – co-founder of Canadian Tire
 J. William Billes – co-founder of Canadian Tire
 Josh Binstock – Olympic volleyball player
 Conrad Black – media mogul
 Jully Black – R&B singer
 Rachel Blanchard – actress
 Lloyd Bochner – actor (Dynasty)
 Andy Borodow – Olympic wrestler
 Devon Bostick – actor, known for playing Rodrick in the Diary of a Wimpy Kid series
 Hédi Bouraoui – poet, novelist and academic
 John McEntee Bowman – founding president of Bowman-Biltmore Hotels Corp.
 Liona Boyd – classical guitarist, composer, songwriter and singer
 Shary Boyle – artist
 Diana Braithwaite – electric blues singer, songwriter and screenwriter
 Cindy Breakspeare – Miss World 1976 and mother of Grammy-winning reggae musician Damian Marley
 Christopher Britton – actor, stage actor, and voice actor
 Daniel Brooks – theatre director, actor and playwright
 Chester Brown – alternative cartoonist and Libertarian Party of Canada candidate
 Clifton Brown – kickboxer
 Billy Bryans – musician
 Rob Burgess – tech CEO
 Marty Burke – former NHL player
 Theresa Burke – journalist
 Matthew Burnett – record producer
 Martha Burns – actress
 Jackie Burroughs – actress
 Jim Butterfield – computer programmer

C
 Daniel Caesar – singer
 Barry Callaghan – historian
 Morley Callaghan – journalist, writer
 June Callwood – social activist, journalist
 Bill Cameron – journalist
 Christian Campbell – actor
 Neve Campbell – actress (Party of Five, Scream series)
 Nicholas Campbell – actor (Da Vinci's Inquest)
 Sterling Campbell – former MPP
 John Candy – comic actor
 Jim Carrey – actor and comedian
 Shelley Carroll – municipal politician
 Anson Carter – professional hockey player
 Luciana Carro – actress
 Gino Cavallini – former NHL player
 Lucas Cavallini – soccer player
 Paul Cavallini – former NHL player
 Patrick Chan – figure skater
 Christopher Chapman – film director, writer, and cinematographer
 Hayden Christensen – actor
 Choclair – hip hop musician
 Ping Chong – contemporary theatre director
 Olivia Chow – New Democratic Party Member of Parliament, former Toronto city councillor
 George Chuvalo – boxer
 Jerry Ciccoritti – film, TV, and theatre director
 Casey Cizikas – NHL player
 William Robinson Clark – theologian, Fellow and President of the Royal Society of Canada
 Austin Clarke – writer
 Adrienne Clarkson – journalist, broadcaster and former Governor-General of Canada
 David Clarkson – NHL player
 Paul Clatney – Canadian football player
 Sebastian Cluer – director, producer, writer
 Hampden Zane Churchill Cockburn – recipient of the Victoria Cross
 Andrew Cogliano – NHL player for the Dallas Stars
 Matt Cohen – writer
 Dusty Cohl – filmmaker, co-founder of the Toronto International Film Festival and Canada's Walk of Fame
 Carlo Colaiacovo – NHL player
 Enrico Colantoni – actor (Veronica Mars, Flashpoint)
 John Colicos – actor
 James Collip – scientist
 John Colapinto – journalist, author and novelist
 Alex Colville – painter
 Brian Conacher – former NHL player
 Charlie Conacher – former NHL player
 Pete Conacher – former NHL player
 Roy Conacher – former NHL player
 Kurtis Conner – comedian and youtuber
 Jesse Cook – Juno Award winning guitarist
 Stephen Cook – computer scientist
 Jack Kent Cooke – industrialist
 Adam Copeland –  WWE professional wrestler
 Barry Cort – former MLB player
 Douglas Coupland – writer, artist
 Christina Cox – actress, stuntwoman
 Deborah Cox – singer
 Harold Scott MacDonald Coxeter – world's best known geometer
 Laura Creavalle – Guyanese-born Canadian/American professional bodybuilder
 Rob Crifo – Canadian football player
 Jonathan Crombie – actor
 Neil Crone – actor, comedian
 David Cronenberg – film director
 Jim Cuddy – musician, lead singer of Blue Rodeo
 Henry Czerny – actor

D

 Cynthia Dale – actress
 Jennifer Dale – actress
 Cathy Daley – visual artist, educator
 Leslie Dan – businessman
 Mychael Danna – Academy Award-winning film composer (Life of Pi)
 Robertson Davies – writer
 Fred Davis – radio/TV broadcaster (Front Page Challenge)
 Janet Davis – municipal politician
 William B. Davis – actor (The X Files)
 Clifton Dawson – NFL player
 deadmau5 – electronic music producer and DJ
 Michael DeForge – comics artist and illustrator
 Laysla De Oliveira – actress
 Jack Devine – President of the Canadian Amateur Hockey Association and radio personality
 Sergio Di Zio – actor (Flashpoint)
 Chris Diamantopoulos – actor and comedian
 Jack Diamond – architect
 Diamond Rings – music artist
 Wayne Dillon – former NHL player
 Cheri DiNovo – politician
 DL Incognito – hip hop musician
 Nina Dobrev – actress
 Fefe Dobson – singer
 Cory Doctorow – blogger, journalist and science fiction author
 Fateh Doe – rapper, singer, and lyricist
 Andy Donato – editorial cartoonist for the Toronto Sun
 Peter Donato – marathon runner
 Max Douglas a.k.a. Salgood Sam – comic artist, author, and blogger
 Naheed Dosani – doctor
 Riele Downs – actress
 John Drainie – actor
 Drake – rapper
 Kris Draper – NHL
 Dream Warriors – hip hop group
 Jamie Drysdale – ice hockey player
 Rob Ducey – MLB player
 Rick Dudley – former NHL player
 Alexander Roberts Dunn – recipient of the Victoria Cross
 Kyle Bobby Dunn – composer, arranger, performer
 George Dunning – animator, director
 Steve Durbano – former NHL player
 Arthur Jeffrey Dempster – physicist
 Julian Dzeko – DJ/producer and member of Dzeko & Torres with Luis Torres

E
 Jayne Eastwood – actress
 Timothy Eaton – retail proprietor
 Tim Ecclestone – former NHL player
 Tom Edur – former NHL player
 Gary Edwards – former NHL player
 Atom Egoyan – film director
 Oren Eizenman – Israeli-Canadian ice hockey player
 Kilian Elkinson (born 1990) – Bermudian footballer
 David James Elliott – actor (JAG)
 Emma-Lee – singer-songwriter and photographer
 Bob Essensa – former NHL player
 George Evans – jazz singer, producer, recording artist
 Gil Evans – jazz musician
 Jake Evans – ice hockey player for the Montreal Canadiens
 Jordan Evans – record producer
 Dylan Everett – actor

F

 Percy Faith – composer
 George Faludy – poet
 Hilary Farr – home designer, Love It or List It
 Holly Farrell – self-taught outsider artist; Barbie & Ken series
 Leslie Feist – singer-songwriter
 Perdita Felicien – hurdler
 Mario Ferraro – NHL player
 Louis Ferreira – actor
 Sharon Fichman – Canadian/Israeli tennis player
 Timothy Findley – writer
 Melanie Fiona – R&B musician
 John Fitzpatrick – track and fielder, football player, engineer and inventor
 Joe Flaherty – comic actor
 Patrick Flatley – former NHL player
 Dave Foley – comedian
 Megan Follows – actress (Anne of Green Gables)
 Evan Fong – YouTube Personality also called VanossGaming
 Adam Foote – former NHL player
 Doug Ford Sr. – businessman and politician
 Doug Ford Jr. – politician and businessman
 Michael Ford – politician
 Rob Ford – 64th Mayor of Toronto
 Dwight Foster – former NHL player
 Liam Foudy – NHL player
 Sean Foudy – football player
 Rick Fox – NBA basketball player and actor
 Lou Franceschetti – former NHL player
 Mark Friedman – NHL player
 Barbara Frum – journalist, news anchor
 David Frum – political commentator
 Ajay Fry – television host/personality
 Northrop Frye – literary critic, academic
 David Furnish – filmmaker and producer, husband of Elton John

G
 Sarah Gadon – actress
 Ed Gass-Donnelly – film director, screenwriter and producer
 Daniel Gaudet – Olympic gymnast
 Frank Gehry – architect
 Jack Gelineau – former NHL player
 General Idea – art collective
 Eric Genuis – pianist and composer
 Jian Ghomeshi – radio and TV broadcaster, writer, musician
 Graeme Gibson – writer
 Sky Gilbert – writer, actor, drag performer
 Shai Gilgeous-Alexander – NBA player
 Paul Gillis – former NHL player
 George Clay Ginty – Union Army Brigadier General
 Mark Giordano – NHL player for the Toronto Maple Leafs
 Ken Girard – former NHL player
 Malcolm Gladwell – writer (Tipping Point, Blink!)
 Natalie Glebova – Miss Universe Canada 2005, Miss Universe 2005
 Brian Glennie – former NHL player
 Fred Glover – former NHL player and coach
 Warren Godfrey – former NHL player
 Ritika Goel – doctor, writer, academic, activist
 Thelma Golden – All-American Girls Professional Baseball League player
 Emma Goldman – political activist
 Kat Goldman – singer-songwriter
 Glenn Goldup – former NHL player
 Sasha Gollish – competitive runner
 Larry Goodenough – former NHL player
 Barclay Goodrow – NHL ice hockey player
 Allan Gotlieb – ex-Canadian diplomat
 Sondra Gotlieb – writer
 Glenn Gould – pianist
 Katherine Govier – writer
 Lawrence Gowan – musician, lead vocalist of the band Styx (1999–present)
 Barbara Gowdy – writer, fiction
 Dakota Goyo – actor
 Arthur Edward Grasett – commander of VIII Corps during the Second World War
 Edward Greenspan – lawyer and politician
 Barbara Greenwood – educator and children's author
 Kathryn Greenwood – actress
 John Greyson – filmmaker (Proteus)
 Lynne Griffin – actress
 Shenae Grimes – actress
 Paul Gross – actor, producer, director
 Allan Grossman – politician
 Group of Seven – art collective
 Peter Gzowski – radio broadcaster (CBC Radio's Morningside) and writer

H
 Ian Hacking – philosopher
 Corey Haim – actor
 George Hainsworth – former NHL player
 Michael Hainsworth – business reporter
 Barbara Hamilton – actress
 Dougie Hamilton – NHL player, currently with the New Jersey Devils
 Moshe Hammer – violinist
 Rick Hampton (born 1956) – former NHL player
 Ned Hanlan – rower
 Yuzuru Hanyu – figure skater
 Stephen Harper (born 1959) – 22nd Prime Minister of Canada
 Billy Harris (1935–2001) – former NHL player
 Billy Harris (born 1952) – former NHL player
 Lawren Harris – Group of Seven artist
 Richard Harrison – poet
 Don Harron – comedian, actor, director, radio/TV host, author and composer
 Leon Hatziioannou – Canadian football player
 Asante Haughton – mental health worker and activist
 Dale Hawerchuk – former NHL player
 Brent Hawkes – clergyman, gay rights activist
 Ronnie Hawkins – musician
 Jeff Healey – musician
 Steven Heighton – novelist, poet
 Alan Milliken Heisey Sr. – politician, author, publisher
 Karl Brooks Heisey – mining engineer and executive
 Lawrence Heisey – publisher
 Joy Henderson – anti-racism activist
 Murray Henderson – former NHL player
 Adam Henrich (born 1984) – ice hockey player
 Michael Henrich (born 1980) – ice hockey player
 Sheila Heti – author
 Foster Hewitt – sports broadcaster (Hockey Night in Canada)
 W. A. Hewitt – sports executive and journalist, Hockey Hall of Fame inductee
 Dan Hill – singer-songwriter
 George Hislop – gay activist
 Lionel Hitchman – former NHL player
 Joshua Ho-Sang (born 1996) – ice hockey player
 Joseph Hobson – engineer
 Nadia L. Hohn – children's book writer
 Clive Holden – poet, film director and visual artist
 Laurie Holden – actress (The Walking Dead)
 Mike Hoolboom – filmmaker
 Kenny Hotz – actor (Kenny vs Spenny)
 Lauren Howe – Miss Universe Canada 2017
 Alexander Hryshko – photographer
 Andrew Huang – musician / Youtuber
 Jack Hughes (born 2001) – NHL player
 Stuart Hughes – actor
 Walter Huston – Academy Award-winning actor (The Treasure of the Sierra Madre)
 William Hutt – actor (Stratford Festival)
 Zach Hyman – NHL ice hockey player

I
 Marci Ien – journalist and politician
 Michael Ignatieff – federal Liberal leader, academic, journalist
 George "Punch" Imlach – former NHL coach and general manager
 Robin Ingle – CEO and chairman of the Ingle Group of Companies
 Malcolm Ingram – independent film director and podcaster
 Gary Inness – former NHL player
 Harold Innis – economist and university professor
 Michael Ironside – actor
 Kenneth E. Iverson – computer scientist

J
 A.Y. Jackson – Group of Seven artist
 Harvey "Busher" Jackson – former NHL player
 Jane Jacobs – economist, urban theorist and activist
 Lisa Jakub – former child actress
 Stephan James – actor
 Gary Jarrett – former NHL player
 Maureen Jennings – novelist
 Peter Jennings – ABC News anchor
 Connor Jessup – actor, short film director
 Norman Jewison – film director (Moonstruck)
 Joël – singer-songwriter, dancer
 Harold E. Johns – medical physicist
 Amy Jo Johnson – actress
 Ben Johnson – sprinter, stripped of 100m gold medal at 1988 Summer Olympics for doping
 Molly Johnson – singer-songwriter
 Jamie Johnston – actor
 George Jonas – writer, journalist
 Cory Joseph – National Basketball Association player, currently playing for the Indiana Pacers
 Demetrius Joyette – actor
 Just John x Dom Dias – Musical Duo

K
 William Kahan – mathematician and computer scientist
 Irving Kaplansky – mathematician
 Moez Kassam – hedge fund manager, founder of Anson Group
 Hadley Kay – actor
 Sherry Kean – singer
 Trenna Keating – actress
 Ben Kerr – busker
 Mart Kenney – jazz musician and bandleader
 The Kids in the Hall – television comedy troupe
 Gail Kim – female professional wrestler
 William Lyon Mackenzie King – 10th Prime Minister of Canada
 Gord Kirke – lawyer and sports executive
 Mia Kirshner – actor
 Naomi Klein – journalist, author (No Logo, The Shock Doctrine) and social activist
 K'naan – hip hop musician
 Mike Knuble – former NHL player
 Chris Kontos – former NHL player
 Terry Koumoudouros – strip club owner-operator
 K-os – hip hop musician
 Ted Kotcheff – director
 George Kottaras – MLB player
 H. David Kotz – attorney
 Anton Kuerti – pianist
 Aggie Kukulowicz – former NHL player, Air Canada travel agent
 Maya Kulenovic – painter
 Floyd Kuptana – Inuit artist
 Faisal Kutty – lawyer, writer, Muslim activist
 Bruce Kuwabara – architect
 Nick Kypreos – former NHL player

L
 George Lagogianes – news anchor, reporter and TV personality
 Don Lake – actor and writer
 Maurice LaMarche – voice actor (Animaniacs, Pinky and the Brain, Tiny Toon Adventures)
 Heath Lamberts – theatre actor
 Laurene Landon – actress
 Michele Landsberg – journalist, author, public speaker, feminist and social activist
 Tory Lanez – rapper
 Richie Laryea – soccer player
 Mel Lastman – 62nd Mayor of Toronto; businessman
 Henry Lau – singer, musician, actor, and ex-member of South Korean boy band Super Junior M
 Jack Layton – politician, leader of the federal New Democratic Party
 Mike Layton – municipal politician, son of Jack Layton
 Michael Lazarovitch – actor
 Vanessa Le Page – professional cake artist
 Stephen Leacock – writer, humourist
 Christine Peng-Peng Lee – Olympic and NCAA gymnast
 Dennis Lee – children's author, poet
 Geddy Lee – musician, lead singer of Rush
 Mark Lee – musician, member of NCT group, Canadian South Korean singer
 Sook-Yin Lee – media personality
 Michael Lee-Chin – businessman, investor
 Manny Legace – former NHL player
 Peter C. Lemon – recipient of the Medal of Honor
 E.J. Lennox – architect
 Sean Leon – rapper
 Dan Lett – actor
 David Levin – Israeli ice hockey player
 Baruch Levine – singer and entertainer
 Alex "Mine Boy" Levinsky (1910–1990) – NHL hockey player
 Tamara Levitt – author, mindfulness instructor, and voice over artist most widely known as the narrator for the Calm app
 Dan Levy – TV host and actor
 Avi Lewis – documentary filmmaker and radio/TV broadcaster
 Dana Lewis – journalist
 Glenn Lewis – R&B singer
 Ivor Lewis – sculptor
 Sharon Lewis – journalist
 Stephen Lewis – former UN Special Envoy for HIV/AIDS in Africa, former politician, humanitarian and academic
 Alex Lifeson – musician, guitarist of Rush
 Lights – musician
 Thea Lim – writer
 Elena Lobsanova – ballet dancer
 Jason Logan – illustrator, writer, graphic designer, and art director
 Robert K. Logan – author and academic
 Bob Lorimer – former NHL player
 Steve Ludzik – former NHL player
 James Lumbers – painter
 Laurie Lynd – Canadian screenwriter and director
 George Seymour Lyon – gold medalist in golf at St. Louis Olympics 1904; reigning champion for 112 years

M
 Raine Maida – folk singer
 Eddie MacCabe – sports journalist and writer
 Ann-Marie MacDonald – playwright, novelist, actor and journalist
 J.E.H. MacDonald – Group of Seven artist
 Norm Macdonald – comic actor (Saturday Night Live)
 Daniel MacIvor – playwright, actor and theatre/film director
 Steve Mackall – voice actor
 William Lyon Mackenzie – first Mayor of Toronto; first president of the Republic of Canada; a leader in the Upper Canada Rebellion
 John James Richard Macleod – biochemist and physiologist
 Margaret MacMillan – historian and expert of leader international relationships
 Maestro – hip-hop musician
 Daniel Magder – actor
 Christine Magee – spokesperson and co-founder of Sleep Country Canada
 Arnaud Maggs – artist
 Jamaal Magloire – former NBA player
 Kevin Maguire – former NHL player
 Victor Malarek – journalist
 Giorgio Mammoliti – municipal politician
 Manafest – Christian rapper/singer-songwriter
 Howie Mandel – actor, comedian, writer, producer
 Dylan Mandlsohn – stand-up comedian
 Peter Mansbridge – CBC News chief correspondent
 Jay Manuel – make-up artist/fashion photographer
 Lisa Marcos – actress, former model
 Simon Marcus – kickboxer
 Hector Marinaro – soccer coach and former forward
 Rob Marinaro – soccer coach and former goalkeeper
 Amanda Marshall – singer-songwriter
 Ruth Marshall – actress (Flashpoint)
 Mae Martin – comedian, writer, actor (Feel Good)
 Russell Martin – MLB player
 Dennis Maruk – former NHL player
 Ron Marzel – lawyer
 James Mason – banker, Senator and soldier
 Mark Masri – tenor and gospel singer
 Mena Massoud – actor
 Raymond Massey – actor
 Vincent Massey – 18th Governor-General of Canada
 Walter Massey – actor
 Pat Mastroianni – actor (Degrassi Junior High)
 Cameron Mathison – actor
 Bruce Mau – designer (S,M,L,XL)
 James Mavor – economist and social figure
 Brad May – former NHL player
 Rachel McAdams – actress
 Wallace McCain – McCain foods and Maple leaf foods
 Sheila McCarthy – actress
 Eric McCormack – actor (Will and Grace)
 Ernest McCulloch – cellular biologist
 Dean McDermott – actor and reality show personality (Tori & Dean: Inn Love)
 Bruce McDonald – film director
 Kevin McDonald – comedian, actor, member of The Kids in the Hall
 Michael McGowan – film director
 Don McKellar – actor, screenwriter and film director
 Seaton McLean – film and TV producer
 Marshall McLuhan – academic and writer (Understanding Media)
 Evgenia Medvedeva – Russian figure skater
 Gerry Meehan – former NHL player
 Shawn Mendes – musician, singer
 Heather Menzies – actress (The Sound of Music)
 Lindsay G Merrithew – actor, producer, fitness entrepreneur
 Lorne Michaels – producer and creator of Saturday Night Live
 Michie Mee – hip hop musician
 Rick Middleton – former NHL player
 Ramona Milano – actress (Due South)
 Greg Millen – former NHL player
 David Mirvish – theatrical impresario
 Ed Mirvish – theatrical impresario, founder of Honest Ed's
 Rohinton Mistry – writer
 Stacie Mistysyn – actress (Degrassi Junior High)
 Joni Mitchell – musician
 Kim Mitchell – musician
 Shay Mitchell – actress
 Colin Mochrie – actor and improvisational comedian (Whose Line Is It Anyway?)
 Geraldine Moodie – photographer
 Dora Mavor Moore – founder of Canada's professional theater
 Mavor Moore – pioneer of Canadian television
 Rick Moranis – actor, comedian, writer, producer
 Jeffrey Morgan – writer, photographer, authorized biographer (Alice Cooper, Iggy Pop & The Stooges)
 Raymond Moriyama – architect
 Greg Morris – Canadian football player
 Dylan Moscovitch – Olympic medalist pair skater
 James Motluk – filmmaker
 Murray Douglas Morton – lawyer, trustee and chair of Toronto Board of Education, Member of Parliament
 Farley Mowat – writer
 Mr. Attic – hip hop musician
 Rania El Mugammar – writer, educator, activist
 Hope Muir – artistic director designate of National Ballet of Canada
 Craig Muni – former NHL player
 Peter Munk – founder of Barrick Gold
 Robert Munsch – children's author
 Mike Murphy – former NHL player
 Anne Murray – singer
 Mathew Murray – writer, web series creator
 Barton Myers – architect
 Mike Myers – comic actor (Saturday Night Live, Austin Powers)
 Alannah Myles – singer

N
 Mark Napier – former NHL player
 Nash the Slash – musician
  Nasri – pop singer
 Nav – musician and record producer
 Natasha Negovanlis – actress, singer and songwriter
 Daniel Negreanu – professional poker player
 Donald Gordon Medd Nelson – 23rd Canadian Surgeon General
 David Nemirovsky – former NHL player
 Lance Nethery – former NHL player
 John Neville – English actor
 Kevin Newman – journalist and news anchor
 Evelyn Ng – professional poker player
 Andrew Nicholson – National Basketball Association, Orlando Magic
 Jayde Nicole – model and former Playboy Playmate
 Danny Nykoluk – former CFL player
 Mike Nykoluk – former NHL player

O
 Kardinal Offishall – rapper/record producer
 John "Peanuts" O'Flaherty – former NHL player
 Catherine O'Hara – comedic actress (SCTV, Beetlejuice, Best in Show)
 Heather Ogden – principal dancer with the National Ballet of Canada
 Mary Margaret O'Hara – singer/songwriter
 Sidney Olcott – director
 Jamie Oleksiak – NHL player
 Penny Oleksiak – swimmer, Olympic gold medallist
 Kelly Olynyk – NBA player (Boston Celtics);
 Michael Ondaatje – Booker Prize-winning writer (The English Patient)
 Kenneth Oppel – author (Silverwing saga, Airborn trilogy)
 Alexandra Orlando – gymnast
 Johnny Orlando – singer
 Mark Osborne – former NHL player
 Jonathan Osorio – soccer player
 Peter Outerbridge – actor
 Seiji Ozawa – conductor

P
 Charles Pachter – artist
 Owen Pallett – violinist and singer
 Mike Palmateer – former NHL player
 Jesse Palmer – NFL football player and reality show personality (The Bachelor)
 Alice Panikian – model and Miss Universe Canada 2006
 Rachel Parent – activist
 Brad Park – former NHL player
 Gerard Parkes – Irish-born actor
 Amy Parkinson – poet
 Tom Pashby – ophthalmologist, sport safety advocate and chairman of the Canadian Standards Association
 Larry Patey – former NHL player
 Steve Payne – former NHL player
 Peaches – musician
 Miranda de Pencier – director film and TV
 Lester B. Pearson – 14th Prime Minister of Canada; 1957 Nobel Peace Prize laureate
 Michael Peca – former NHL player
 Adam Pelech – NHL player
 Mike Pelyk – former NHL player
 Miklos Perlus – actor, screenwriter
 Russell Peters – comedian
 Vera Peters OC – scientist, oncologist
 Michael Pezzetta – NHL player
 Parichay (singer) – Bollywood/ Hip Hop/ R&B and Pop music producer and artist
 Nathan Phillips – 52nd Mayor of Toronto
 Rina Piccolo – cartoonist
 Mary Pickford – actress, co-founder of United Artists
 Alex Pierzchalski – CFL player
 Cara Pifko – actress
 Alison Pill – actress
 Lido Pimienta – Polaris Prize winning musician and artist
 Alex Pirus – former NHL player
 Christopher Plummer – actor
 Jeremy Podeswa – film director
 John Charles Polanyi – 1986 Nobel Prize in Chemistry
 Brett Polegato – Grammy Award-winning operatic baritone
 Sarah Polley – actress, screenwriter and film director (Away from Her)
 Carole Pope – rock singer
 Anna Porter – publisher
 Chris Potter – actor (Kung Fu: The Legend Continues), musician, pitchman
 Russ Powers  former politician
 Victoria Pratt – actress
 Robert Priest – poet, children's author and singer/songwriter
 Alice Priestley – children's writer and illustrator
 Jason Priestley – actor (Beverly Hills, 90210)
 Uno Prii – architect

Q
 Bill Quackenbush – former NHL player
 Joel Quarrington – musician (Toronto Symphony Orchestra, National Arts Centre Orchestra)
 Paul Quarrington – author, screenwriter and musician
 Quinn – soccer player

R
 Emma Raducanu – tennis player
 Kyle Rae – consultant, former municipal politician
 Nisha Rajagopal – singer
 David Rakoff – author
 James Randi – magician
 Milos Raonic – tennis player
 Dennis Raphael – professor
 Leo Rautins – broadcaster and former NBA player
 Lisa Ray – actress
 Raheel Raza – author
 Michael Redhill – writer
 Keanu Reeves – actor
 Albert Reichmann – businessman
 Paul Reichmann – businessman
 Noah Reid – actor
 Ivan Reitman – director
 John Relyea – opera singer
 Renforshort – singer
 Liisa Repo-Martel – actress
 Gloria Reuben – actress
 Jessie Reyez – singer
 Nino Ricci – writer
 Spencer Rice – actor/entertainer (Kenny vs Spenny)
 Daniel Richler – broadcaster and writer
 Sandie Rinaldo – journalist, TV anchor for CTV News
 Guillermo Rishchynski – current Canadian Ambassador to the United Nations
 Roam – Musician
 Anastasia Rizikov – pianist
 John D. Roberts – news anchor for Fox News Channel
 Megan Roberts – gymnast for the Georgia Gym Dogs
 Robbie Robertson – musician
 Coco Rocha – model
 Edward Samuel Rogers – CEO of Rogers Communications
 Rino Romano – actor, voice actor
 Bobby Roode – professional wrestler
 Goody Rosen – former MLB player
 Lukas Rossi – singer
 Marty Roth – race car driver
 The Royal Canadian Air Farce – comedy troupe
 Jan Rubeš – opera singer and actor
 Baņuta Rubess – playwright and theatre director
 Anna Russell – concert comedian
 Ann Rutherford – actress

S
 Moshe Safdie – architect
 Morley Safer – journalist (60 Minutes)
 Eric Sage – international touring singer, entertainer, recording artist, and actor
 F. A. Sampson – war hero (RCAF WWII)
 Saukrates – hip hop musician
 John Ralston Saul – writer
 Booth Savage – actor
 Tyrone Savage – actor (Wind at My Back)
 Monika Schnarre – supermodel and actress
 Kim Schraner – actress (Spynet)
 Albert Schultz – actor, director and the founding artistic director of Toronto's Soulpepper Theatre Company
 Linda Schuyler – television producer (Degrassi franchise)
 Caterina Scorsone – actress
 Sara Seager – astronomer and planetary scientist
 Michael Seater – actor
 Lance Secretan – leadership theorist, writer and consultant
 Derek Sharp – lead singer for The Guess Who
 Isadore Sharp – businessman
 Ken Shaw – former CTV news anchor
 Howard Shore – Academy Award-winning film composer (The Lord of the Rings)
 Martin Short – actor
 Frank Shuster – comedian (Wayne and Shuster)
 Joe Shuster – creator of Superman
 Rosie Shuster – writer
 Steve Shutt – former NHL player
 Jane Siberry – musician
 Khaleel Seivwright – carpenter and activist
 Carmen Silvera – actress ('Allo 'Allo!)
 John Graves Simcoe – first Lieutenant Governor of Upper Canada; founder of the town of York (now Toronto)
 Al Sims – former NHL player
 Gail Simmons – food author, cookbook writer and judge on TV series Top Chef
 Gordon Sinclair – journalist, writer and commentator
 Lilly Singh – actress, motivational speaker, model, rapper, vlogger, comedian and founder of Girllove
 Darryl Sittler – former NHL player
 Rachel Skarsten – actress (Birds of Prey, Lost Girl)
 Inga Skaya – Miss Universe Canada 2007
 Josef Škvorecký – writer
 Amy Sky – country singer
 Willis C. Silverthorn – Wisconsin politician
 Colin Simpson – author
 Chantal Singer – internationally ranked competitive water skier
 Glenn Smith – former NHL player
 Gregory Smith – actor
 Reginald "Hooley" Smith – former NHL player
 Sid Smith – former NHL player
 Steve Smith – comedian, actor and writer
 Sonja Smits – Canadian actress
 Snow – musician
 Michael Snow – artist
 James Sommerville – hornist and conductor
 David Soren – film director
 Jason Spezza – NHL player
 Fred Stanfield – former NHL player
 Larry M. Starr – consultant, academic administrator, university professor, and research scientist
 Jessica Steen – actress
 Shelley Steiner – Olympic fencer
 Mark Steyn – journalist
 Amanda Stepto – actress (Degrassi Junior High)
 Rob Stewart (actor) – actor
 Rob Stewart (filmmaker) – filmmaker
 Stephen Stohn – television producer (Degrassi franchise)
 Elvis Stojko – former Olympic figure skater
 John Strachan – first Anglican Bishop of Toronto; founder of Trinity College at the University of Toronto
 David Stratas – Justice of the Federal Court of Appeal
 Diane Stratas – former Member of Parliament for Scarborough Centre (electoral district)
 Teresa Stratas – opera singer
 Trish Stratus (born Patrica Stratigias) – former WWE wrestler and fitness model
 Tara Strong – voice/live-action actress (Rugrats, New Batman Adventures, Teen Titans, King of the Hill)
 Les Stroud – survivalist
 George Stroumboulopoulos – TV/radio personality and VJ
 Malcolm Subban – NHL player
 P.K. Subban – former NHL player
 Charlotte Sullivan – actress
 Jack Sullivan – journalist for The Canadian Press
 Kevin Sullivan – writer, director and producer (Anne of Green Gables, Road to Avonlea, Wind at My Back)
 Moez Surani – poet

T
 Rick Tabaracci – former NHL player
 Jeremy Taggart – musician; drummer
 Samantha Tajik – Miss Universe Canada 2008
 Tony Tanti – former NHL player
 Don Tapscott – writer and consultant, technology and business
 John Tavares – lacrosse player
 Mark Taylor – actor (Student Bodies, Flashpoint)
 R. Dean Taylor – singer/songwriter ("Indiana Wants Me")
 Tamara Taylor – actress
 Tanya Taylor – Canadian fashion designer
 Kat Teasdale – auto racing driver
 Ty Templeton – cartoonist and writer
 Menaka Thakkar – dancer, choreographer
 Colin Thatcher – politician and convicted murderer
 David Thomson – Canada's wealthiest person; media magnate; 3rd Baron Thomson of Fleet
 Kenneth Thomson – media magnate and art collector; 2nd Baron Thomson of Fleet
 R. H. Thomson – actor (Road to Avonlea)
 Roy Thomson – media magnate; 1st Baron Thomson of Fleet
 Tom Thomson – Group of Seven artist
 Judith Thompson – playwright
 Tristan Thompson – power forward/center, Cleveland Cavaliers
 James E. Till – biophysicist
 Frederick Albert Tilston – recipient of the Victoria Cross
 Morris Titanic – former NHL player
 Frederick George Topham – recipient of the Victoria Cross
 Raffi Torres – NHL player
 Talan Torriero – actor (Laguna Beach: The Real Orange County)
 John Tory – 65th mayor of Toronto
 Paul Tracy – 2003 Champ Car champion
 Justin Trottier – commentator and atheist leader
 Endel Tulving – cognitive psychologist, world authority on human memory function
 Sheldon Turcott – journalist
 Slim Twig – singer

U
 Katherine Uchida – rhythmic gymnast
 Richard Underhill – jazz musician
 Jane Urquhart – author

V
 Ali Velshi – television journalist and anchor for NBC News and MSNBC
 Billy Van – comedian, actor and singer
 Laura Vandervoort – actress (Smallville)
 Pieter Vanden Bos – former CFL player
 Nia Vardalos – actress and writer, stage and film (My Big Fat Greek Wedding)
 Gabriel Varga – kickboxer
 George Vari – developer and philanthropist
 M. G. Vassanji – author
 Mike Veisor – former NHL player
 Kim Venn – astrophysicist and professor
 John Verwey – darts player
 Steve Vickers – former NHL player
 Nerene Virgin – actress, journalist and teacher
 Adnan Virk – sports anchor
 David Visentin – real estate agent, Love It or List It
 Joey Votto – MLB player
 Prvoslav Vujcic – author

W

 The Weeknd – singer-songwriter, actor and director
 George F. Walker – playwright
 Pamela Wallin – Senator, former Canadian Consul-General to New York
 Jake Walman – NHL player
 Joel Ward – former NHL player
 Yasmin Warsame – supermodel
 Alberta Watson – actress
 Tom Watt – former NHL coach
 Al Waxman – actor
 Johnny Wayne – comedian (of Wayne and Shuster)
 Kevin Weekes – broadcaster and former NHL player
 Samantha Weinstein – actress
 Stephen Weiss – former NHL player
 Danny Wells – actor (The Jeffersons) and voice actor
 Wendy – member of South Korean girl group Red Velvet
 Ken Westerfield – disc sports (Frisbee) pioneer, competitor, showman, promoter
 Galen Weston – Canada's second wealthiest man
 Galen Weston Jr. – businessman
 Denis Whitaker – commanded 1st Battalion The Royal Hamilton Light Infantry in the Second World War
 Hobart Johnstone Whitley – real-estate developer, "Father of Hollywood"
 Zoe Whittall – Giller Prize-nominated author
 Ben Wicks – cartoonist, illustrator, journalist and author
 Joyce Wieland – filmmaker
 Andrew Wiggins – NBA player, first overall draft pick in 2014
 Brian Wilks (born 1966) – NHL hockey player
 Healey Willan – composer
 Elyse Willems – internet personality, comedian, writer
 Angel Williams – TNA Knockout pro wrestler
 Fred Williams – journalist, historian
 Genelle Williams  actress
 Harland Williams – actor
 Richard Williams – animator (of Who Framed Roger Rabbit and The Thief and the Cobbler)
 Bree Williamson – actress
 Behn Wilson – former NHL player
 Dunc Wilson – former NHL player
 Michael Wilson – former federal Minister of Finance (1984–1991), former Canadian Ambassador to the United States (2006–2009)
 Murray Wilson – former NHL player
 Ron Wilson – former NHL player
 Ross "Lefty" Wilson – former NHL player
 Tom Wilson – NHL player for the Washington Capitals
 Jeff Wincott – actor (Night Heat)
 Michael Wincott – actor
 Katheryn Winnick – actress
 Daniel Winnik – NHL player
 Maurice Dean Wint – actor
 Ralph E. Winters – film editor (Ben-Hur)
 Maria Torrence Wishart – medical illustrator and the founder of the University of Toronto's Art as Applied to Medicine program
 Karl Wolf – pop singer
 Ellen Wong – actress
 Kristyn Wong-Tam – municipal politician
 Jay Woodcroft – ice hockey coach
 Cam Woolley – former safety and traffic news reporter for CP24
 Hawksley Workman – singer-songwriter
 Roy "Shrimp" Worters – former NHL player
 Kathleen Wynne – 25th Premier of Ontario

Y
 Alissa York – writer
 Howie Young – former NHL player
 Neil Young – rock musician
 Renee Young – host of multiple WWE programs
 Scott Young – sportswriter, journalist and novelist; father of Neil Young
 Warren Young – former NHL player
 Andrew Younghusband – TV personality, writer and journalist
 David Yudelman – South African-born writer
 Catalina Yue – singer

Z
 Zanta – performance artist
 Ron Zanussi – former NHL player
 Zappacosta – singer-songwriter
 Brigitte Zarie – jazz singer-songwriter
 Paul Zaza – film score musician and songwriter
 Eberhard Zeidler – architect
 Peter Zezel – former NHL player
 Moses Znaimer – media mogul (CHUM, founder of Citytv)
 Robert J. Zydenbos – scholar in Indology and philosophy
 Zeds Dead – electronic music DJ duo

See also

 List of mayors of Toronto
 List of people from Ontario

References

 
Toronto
People
Toronto